The National Disability Insurance Scheme (NDIS) is a scheme of the Australian Government that funds costs associated with disability. The scheme was legislated in 2013 and went into full operation in 2020. The scheme is administered by the National Disability Insurance Agency (NDIA) and overseen by the NDIS Quality and Safeguards Commission (NDIS Commission). Bill Shorten provides ministerial oversight as Minister for the National Disability Insurance Scheme.

The scheme entitles people with a "permanent and significant" disability (under the age of 65), to full funding for any "reasonable and necessary" support needs related to their disability (subject to certain restrictions). Funding is allocated to the individual, and the individual or their guardian chooses which providers supply the funded goods and services (subject to certain restrictions).

The scheme is entirely publicly funded: recipients do not purchase or contribute to an insurance policy. The scheme is not means-tested. The word 'insurance' refers to the scheme's use of proactive insurance principles to manage long-term financial sustainability.

NDIS funding is independent of the Disability Support Pension and Medicare, Australia's universal health care insurance scheme. NDIS legislation draws a distinction between health care and disability supports, only the latter being within the remit of the NDIS. In addition to funding for individuals, the scheme funded some general 'information, linkages, and capacity building' (ILC) programs until mid-2020, when ILC programs moved to the Department of Social Services.

History 
The states and territories operated asylums and other institutions for disabled people not long after their establishment, replicating the predominant model of treatment in the United Kingdom. These institutions were often large and residential.

The Commonwealth "Invalid and Old-Age Pensions Act 1908" provided an "Invalid Pension" to people "permanently incapacitated for work" and unable to be supported by their families, (so long as they fulfilled racial and other requirements). This provided money that recipients could spend on their care and assistance.

In 1941, the "Vocational Training Scheme for Invalid Pensioners" was begun by the Curtin Government. This provided occupational therapy and allied services to people who were not permanently incapacitated, to help them gain employment. In 1948, this body became the Commonwealth Rehabilitation Service, and its work continued.

During the 1970s, care of people with severe disability in Australia shifted from institutionalisation to being cared for in the community. In 1974, Gough Whitlam proposed a national disability insurance scheme like the scheme created in New Zealand that year. Academic Donna McDonald suggests it was Treasurer Bill Hayden who convinced Whitlam to focus on the introduction of Medicare instead.

In 1991, the Disability Support Pension (DSP) replaced the Invalid Pension, with the aim of increasing recipients' rehabilitation and hours of paid work.

In 2005, the NSW government created the Lifetime Care and Support Scheme to cover ongoing care for people who had been severely injured in motor accidents.

In 2006, Bruce Bonyhady, chair of Yooralla, met with former Labor cabinet minister Brian Howe, who put him in touch with a group of people who became known as the Disability Investment Group. The Disability Investment Group made an independent submission to the Australia 2020 Summit in 2008. They then sent their recommendations to the Productivity Commission. The Productivity Commission released a report on the issue in 2011. Disability in Australia "was framed as an economic issue, rather than a social issue".  Research by PricewaterhouseCoopers in 2011 found that by approximately 2025 the cost of maintaining the status quo in relation to the care of people with a disability would be greater than the cost of an NDIS. In 2011, the Council of Australian Governments agreed the disability sector in Australia needed reform.

In 2011, it was recommended that psychosocial disability be included in the scheme. Due to the mental health sector's use of the recovery approach rather than a focus on permanent disability, this has been a culture clash.

According to a report from the Australian Institute of Health and Welfare in September 2012, demand for disability aid in Australia had seen significant increases in recent years.

A bill to establish the NDIS was introduced into Federal Parliament in November 2012 by then Prime Minister Julia Gillard. It was passed in March 2013 as the National Disability Insurance Scheme Act 2013. There is a COAG Disability Reform Council which continues to oversee the NDIS.

When the Abbott Government came into power in 2013, the assistant minister in charge of the NDIS was Mitch Fifield, who capped the number of employees the NDIA could have to 3,000, when the Productivity Commission had estimated 10,000.

The 2013 Australian federal budget committed $14.3 billion to the NDIS, to be paid for by increasing the Medicare levy by 0.5%. As of May 2013, the Australian Government estimated the disability sector in Australia would need to double to meet the needs of the NDIS. The first part of the scheme rolled out on 1 July 2013. It was initially known as "DisabilityCare Australia" and commenced only in South Australia, Tasmania, the Hunter Region in New South Wales and the Barwon region of Victoria. The NDIS then commenced in the Australian Capital Territory (ACT) in July 2014. The Medicare levy increased from 1.5% to 2% on 1 July 2014, to fund the NDIS.

In the first nine months of the scheme, 5,400 people with disabilities accessed an NDIS plan.

In February 2015, government disability rehabilitation and employment body CRS Australia was abolished, with its functions being distributed via the NDIS and Disability Employment Services markets.

In late 2015 the Abbott Government began a process of making significant changes to the board of the NDIA. Current board directors, including then board chair Bruce Bonyhady, claimed their positions were advertised publicly before they were informed. In October 2016 then Minister for Social Services, Christian Porter, announced his intention to appoint several new board members, including a new chair. The primary experience of the newly appointed members were in various corporate sectors, including "financial services, health, energy, resources, education and arts sectors", rather than the previous board member's disability sector experience. The new board appointees, including incumbent chairwoman Dr Helen Nugent, were officially announced on 12 January 2017.

The 2016 Australian federal budget attempted to make savings of $2.1 billion for the NDIS fund by re-assessing Disability Support Pension recipients' capacity to work, and cutting compensation for the carbon pricing scheme. This included scrapping an ad campaign letting people know about the NDIS.  Furthermore, this budget committed to reduce the number of permanent employees in the NDIA to 3,000. Peak disability group People with Disability Australia expressed concerns the NDIS would become a 'political football'.

The NDIS was rolled out nationally on 1 July 2016. NDIS CEO, David Bowen, announced his resignation in March 2017, which took effect in November 2017.  He was replaced with former Bankwest CEO, Rob De Luca.

In April 2018, the NDIA announced that Serco would be operating contact centres in Melbourne and regional Victoria for two years.  This prompted concern from peak advocacy body People with Disability Australia and others about Serco's lack of experience with disabilities despite being at the first point of contact with clients.

The Financial Review noted that the NDIS was "becoming an economic factor in its own right", particularly in regional areas.

A report by Flinders University into the running of the NDIS found that half of all participants in the NDIS have either had their support reduced or have not experienced a change in their support levels since the NDIS has been introduced.

In 2018 it was reported that the NDIA had a budget of $10 million for legal services that are employed to attempt to prevent people appealing for more money under the scheme or to prevent them from accessing the scheme. As of May, 260 cases had been resolved by the courts, with the NDIA losing 40% of them.

The NDIS has been developing a virtual assistant called "Nadia" which takes the form of an avatar using the voice of actor Cate Blanchett (see Artificial intelligence in government).

As of 30 June 2019, some 298,816 people with disabilities were being supported by the NDIS. The Tune Review, in 2019, made 29 recommendations to help the NDIS.

In April 2022, around 85% of people with disabilities in Australia were not covered by the NDIS. It served just over 518,000 people out of an estimated 4.4 million Australians living with disability. This was in part because people aged over 65 were not eligible for it.

Services 
The first stage of the NDIS aimed to provide reasonable and necessary support for people with significant and permanent disability.

Supports funded by the NDIS are split across three areas.  "Core Supports" include everyday consumable items such as continence aids, personal care assistance, support with social and community participation and funding for transport.  "Capacity Building" is intended to build the person with disability's independence and ability to manage their own life.  The "Capital Supports" budget is intended for very expensive assistive technology and home or vehicle modifications.  Through the ILC program, NDIS participants have also been supported to run micro-enterprise businesses.

The first year of the launch serviced:
about 3,000 people initially drawn from the NSW local government area of Newcastle
about 1,500 children with disabilities in South Australia from birth to 5 years of age
about 800 eligible young people aged 15 to 24 in Tasmania
about 4,000 people in the Barwon area of Victoria including the local government areas of the City of Greater Geelong, the Colac-Otway Shire, the Borough of Queenscliffe and the Surf Coast Shire, and
the ACT getting ready for launch to support 2,500 residents from July 2014.

The ACT became the first state or territory to complete a NDIS rollout.

The number of people assisted rose to 20,000 people with disabilities by 2015. It has been recommended to increase participation to 410,000 however this figure remains uncertain.  There are two main entry points to the NDIS, through Early Childhood Early Intervention for those under 6 years old, and the general scheme for those between 6 and 65 years of age.

The NDIS is administered by the National Disability Insurance Agency.

In 2017 NDIS had an annual budget of $700 million for specialist disability accommodation, to be used to house 28,000 people with high support needs.

As of 2015, over 7,000 young disabled people lived in aged care homes. One goal of the NDIS is to get younger people with disabilities out of residential aged care settings.

Therapies to treat dysphagia (swallowing difficulties, potentially life-threatening) were funded under the NDIS until late 2017, when they were discontinued.

Healthcare for NDIS recipients 
There has been a call for a critical analysis and evaluation to ensure the integration of the NDIS and the health system. Currently primary care and the public health system act in isolation and there is a call for integration to improve health outcomes. Rather than being person-centred and holistic, the current lack of collaboration has resulted in  siloed care by separating out disability and health conditions.

NDIS participants suffer chronic and severe illness at a much higher rate than the general population, from an earlier age and frequently with greater associated cognitive, social and financial disadvantage. The emergence over the last decade in Australia of patient advocates has shown they deliver better outcomes, fewer hospital bounce-backs and better case management (neither complex care or case management are remunerated to GPs by Medicare). Funding options for NDIS participants for expert healthcare support exist within individual plans according to goals and needs.

Funding 
The cost of the NDIS was a point of contention at a time when the Federal Government insisted upon a return to surplus in the 2013 Australian federal budget. In 2010, the Productivity Commission estimated it would cost A$15 billion a year.  Two years later a Government report revised that figure to $22 billion in 2018. According to the Minister for Disability Reform, Jenny Macklin, the program will effectively double the cost of supporting those with disabilities. A number of state disability ministers initially described the draft legislation for the NDIS as lacking flexibility and criticised it for being too prescriptive.

The first state to fully commit to funding for the scheme was New South Wales on 7 December 2012, with costs roughly divided between federal and state governments. The then Premier of Queensland, Campbell Newman, wanted the federal government to fully fund the scheme, arguing the state cannot commit funds while the state's debt was high. On 8 May 2013, Campbell Newman signed the agreement in support of the program.

An agreement between Tasmania and the federal government was achieved on 2 May 2013. The state committed to $134 million of initial funding. The Northern Territory signed an agreement to join the scheme on 11 May 2013. From 1 July 2014 the Medicare levy rose from 1.5% to 2% to help fund the NDIS.

The scheme's funding has been noted to be complex, with money being pooled from multiple sources at federal and state/territory government levels.  Guide Dogs Victoria has complained that only half of its members are eligible for the NDIS, and that they are losing donations because the public thinks Guide Dogs Victoria is funded under the NDIS.

Scott Morrison announced in January 2017 that the Productivity Commission would be conducting an independent review of the NDIS. A Victorian man who lives at Moriac won a court case against the NDIS for only agreeing to fund 75% of his transport costs to Geelong for his work and "NDIS-supported activities".

The emphasis of the NDIS has been noted to stem from the 2011 productivity commission report that began it.

An 0.5% increase to the Medicare levy was proposed after the 2017 budget, but in April 2018 this was scrapped, as the government had found "other sources of revenue".  Disability groups have urged the government to provide greater clarity.  In 2018 the Morrison Government set up a Drought Future Fund for farmers using $3.9 billion "repurposed" from the NDIS.

The NDIS provides funding to modify homes as per the needs of any disable person so they safely access it and move around comfortably in areas they frequently use. The NDIA also finance fair and appropriate supports related to or incidental to home modifications in some cases.

A 2021 report by independent think tank Per Capita estimated that for every dollar spent on the NDIS, there was a return of investment of $2.25.  The NDIS is the second most expensive government program in Australia, after the aged pension.

Staffing 
The Productivity Commission reported that some areas had less than 40% of the number of disability services employees needed to cope with demand for NDIS services.  The NDIA spent over $180 million on consultants and contractors between July 2016 and October 2017, which Jenny Macklin argues is due to the NDIA operating under a staffing cap.  Disability support workers only identified negative aspects to the NDIS on the quality of jobs in interviews with UNSW.  The Albanese government will remove the staffing cap.

As of 2021, it was estimated that the NDIS employs over 270,000 people over 20 different occupations, and indirectly contributes to the employment of tens of thousands more.

How NDIS plans are managed 
Each participant has funds allocated in what is called a plan.  Each plan contains funding that can be spent on pre-approved activities such as therapies. There are three ways a NDIS plan can be managed: by the participant or their nominee managing the plan, by a registered plan management provider, or by the NDIA. Where the participant self-manages their plan, they are told to keep records of all purchases in case of a future audit.

NDIS Quality and Safeguards Commission 

The NDIS Quality and Safeguards Commission (NQSC) allows participants in the NDIS to make complaints about the safety and quality of services provided through the NDIS. From 1 July 2020, the NQSC will gain full jurisdiction of the quality and safety of the NDIS throughout Australia. The Commission gained oversight for the NDIS in New South Wales and South Australia on 1 July 2018. Starting 1 July 2019, it also began operations in Queensland, the ACT, Victoria, Tasmania, and the Northern Territory. Its final starting date, 1 July 2020, will see the NQSC will gain oversight of the NDIS in Western Australia, bringing the entirety of the NDIS under the scrutiny of the NQSC.

Information Linkages and Capacity Building (ILC) program 
While the NDIS will support some people with disability in Australia, the ILC program aims to support all PWD in Australia by improving the community's ability to welcome PWD, and helping PWD to access wider community supports.  The ILC program provides grants to organisations.  From mid-2020, the ILC program moved to the Department of Social Services.

Independent assessments 
In 2021, independent assessments were to be introduced for NDIS participants over the age of 7. The independent assessments will focus on "individual circumstances and functional capacity".  Assessors will be qualified health professionals who are not NDIA employees, and they cannot be a participant's regular healthcare professional.  Assessments will take 1 to 4 hours, and the assessors will "ask you questions about your life and what matters to you, and ask to see how you approach some everyday tasks. They will work through some standardised assessment tools with you, based on your age or disability".  Disability advocates are concerned about the introduction of independent assessments, and the NDIA has explicitly linked the introduction of independent assessments to containing the cost of the NDIS.  While the Coalition government is committed to introducing independent assessments, they do not enjoy parliamentary support.

Carers 
While a 2014 government report on the NDIS predicted the scheme would enable carers to participate more in the workforce or in work-allied activities, as of 2018, there was limited evidence that this was the case.

Access issues and criticism

In the year 2015–2016, only 76% of participants' funds were utilised, which the Productivity Commission has stated was concerning as this could lead to poorer outcomes for participants.  As of 2017, approximately 90% of NDIS costs were related to participant funding packages.

In 2018, Bruce Bonyhady said that a key issue that was yet to be resolved was what the supports were for those not the NDIS. There have been concerns that people with mild intellectual disabilities, as well as those who are socially marginalised, will find it difficult to engage with the NDIS.

Jan Pike, former Paralympian, said in February 2017 that while having been on the NDIS, it took five months for a wheelchair to be delivered to her, and she could not get contractors to install a shower handrail because they were worried about not getting paid due to the NDIS web portal being "broken". A Facebook group, "NDIS Grassroots Discussion", was created for use by people with a disability to discuss their experiences with the NDIS.

In April 2017 Kirsten Harley, who had a terminal illness, was denied augmented communication through the NDIS because her condition would deteriorate. Neurological Alliance Australia said NDIS plans aren't being made with the input of people who understand neurological conditions and so were inadequate. Dr Justin Yerbury was denied wheelchair and accessible housing modifications due to being assessed as having a poor life expectancy. Tim Rubenach was in the NDIS, but his assistive equipment delivery was delayed until after his death.  His family have said that the delays in receiving his equipment hastened his death.

In June 2017 it was reported that the process of writing NDIS plans had been reduced to hours rather than weeks, and people requesting a review were being cut off from basic services.

It was reported in May 2017 that in the Barwon region, for adults with disabilities, administration times had lengthened, but services had not increased.

Guidelines have been developed to show how the NDIS will interact with other systems, such as health systems, child protection, and education services.  These interactions were described in September 2017 as being open to "cost-shifting" between the NDIS and existing services.

In September 2017 it was reported that many specialist services were closing due to no longer having block funding, making it harder for NDIS participants to be able to use their packages.

In September 2017 it was predicted that childhood disabilities with a late onset (ages 2–3) were likely to be under-served in the ECEI model.

The peak body for disability services in Australia, National Disability Services, estimated in February 2018 that the NDIS may have owed up to $300 million to service providers.

The Australian newspaper noted in March 2018 that tarot card readers and other fringe therapy providers had become NDIS providers.

In July 2018, the NDIA asked that an Aboriginal boy in Tennant Creek be placed into care.

Participants or their carers can appeal decisions made around their NDIS funding by going to the Administrative Appeals Tribunal.

The amount of funding that young children can be allocated for therapies is determined based on an internal NDIA guideline rather than the recommendations of treating experts.

See also
List of South Australian organisations providing support to people with a disability

References

External links 
 

Disability in Australia
Public policy in Australia
2013 introductions
Gillard Government